48th Police Precinct Station is a historic police station located at 1925 Bathgate Avenue in the Tremont neighborhood of the Bronx, New York City.  It was completed in 1901 and is a freestanding, three story rectangular block, seven bays wide.  The facades are composed of yellow brick with stone trim in the Italian Renaissance Revival style.

It was formerly used by the New York City Police Department, but ceased use as a police station in the 1970s. As of June 2010, it was occupied by Sharon Baptist Headstart.

It was listed on the National Register of Historic Places in 1983.

References

History of the Bronx
Government buildings on the National Register of Historic Places in New York City
Government buildings in the Bronx
Infrastructure completed in 1901
Renaissance Revival architecture in New York City
Italian Renaissance Revival architecture in the United States
Police stations on the National Register of Historic Places
National Register of Historic Places in the Bronx
New York City Police Department buildings